Frédéric-Eugène Godefroy, (13 February 1826, Paris – 30 September 1897, Lestelle-Bétharram) was a French author, notable for his works on the history of the French language, notably compiling a 10-volume Old French dictionary of over 20,000 pages.

Publications
 Histoire de la littérature française depuis le XVIe siècle jusqu’à nos jours, 1859–1863
 Lexique comparée de la langue de Corneille et de la langue du XVIIe siècle en général, 1862
 Morceaux choisis des prosateurs et poètes français des XVIIe, XVIIIe et XIXe siècles, 1872
 L’Instrument de la revanche. Études sur les principaux collèges chrétiens, 3 vol., 1872
 Morceaux choisis des prosateurs et poètes français du 9e au XVIe, gradués en cinq cours
 Histoire de la littérature française, depuis le XVIe siècle jusqu'à nos jours, 15 volumes
 La Mission de Jeanne d’Arc, 1878
 Dictionnaire de l’ancienne langue française du IXe siècle au XVe siècle, 1881

References

1826 births
1897 deaths
Writers from Paris
French lexicographers
French male non-fiction writers
19th-century lexicographers